CUTS may refer to

 Computer Users' Tape Standard, a standard for storage of digital microcomputer data on consumer quality cassettes
 CUTS International (Consumer Unity & Trust Society), a non-profit organisation committed to fulfilling the developmental aspirations of the poor
 Compact utility tractors, tractors designed primarily for landscaping and estate management tasks
 Central University for Tibetan Studies, in Sarnath, Varanasi, Uttar Pradesh, India
 Cuts, Oise, a commune in France

See also
 Cut (disambiguation)